Theresia Haidlmayr (9 September 1955 – 13 June 2022) was an Austrian politician. She was spokesperson for The Greens – The Green Alternative until 2008.

Life
Haidlmayr was born in Steyr in 1955. She rose to prominence as the spokesperson of the Green Party in Austria from 1994 to 2008, serving in the National Council. At the next election in 2008 she decided not to be a candidate because she was disheartened by the low profile that her party had given to issues for disabled people. Haidlmayr had Osteogenesis imperfecta and used a wheelchair. It was announced that the decision to not seek election was Haidlmayr's.

Honours 
Haidlmayr was awarded the Grand Decoration of Honour in Silver for Services to the Republic of Austria in 2004.

References

1955 births
2022 deaths
People from Steyr
The Greens – The Green Alternative politicians
Members of the National Council (Austria)
Austrian people with disabilities
People with osteogenesis imperfecta
21st-century Austrian women politicians
21st-century Austrian politicians
Recipients of the Decoration for Services to the Republic of Austria